Chatterton is a surname. Notable people with the surname include:

Sir Alfred Chatterton (1866–1958), British pioneer of industry in India
Anna Chatterton, Canadian playwright
F. B. Chatterton, (1834–1886), theatre manager
Fenimore Chatterton (1860–1958), American businessman
Frederick Chatterton (1814–1894), English harpist 
Georgiana Chatterton (1806–1876), British traveller and author
John Chatterton, wreck diver
John Balsir Chatterton, English harpist
Ruth Chatterton (1892–1961), American actress
Thomas Chatterton (1752–1770), English poet and forger
Tom Chatterton (1881–1952), American actor
William Chatterton (1861–1913), English cricketer